The 1904 Harvard Crimson football team represented Harvard University in the 1903 college football season. The Crimson finished with a 7–2–1 record under first-year head coach Edgar Wrightington.  Walter Camp selected only one Harvard player, halfback Daniel Hurley, as a first-team selection to his 1904 College Football All-America Team.

Schedule

References

Harvard
Harvard Crimson football seasons
Harvard Crimson football
1900s in Boston